Swinger or swingers may refer to:

Music
 Performers associated with swing music, a jazz style developed in the 1930s and 1940s
 The Swinger (album), a 1958 album by trumpeter Harry Edison
 The Swingers, a New Zealand rock band active 1979–1982

Film and television
 The Swinger, a 1966 film directed by George Sidney
 Swingers (1996 film), a 1996 comedy-drama film
 Swingers (2002 film), a Dutch feature film
 Swingers (2016 film), a Latvian comedy
 "Swingers" (Wonder Years episode)

People
 Johnny Swinger, ring name of American professional wrestler Joseph Dorgan (born 1975)
 Rashod Swinger (born 1974), American National Football League player

Other uses
 Partners engaged in swinging (sexual practice), a form of non-monogamy 
 , six ships of the Royal Navy
 Swinger Bay, a bay on the north west shore of Milne Bay, Papua New Guinea
 Fender Swinger, a rare vintage Fender guitar
 Polaroid Swinger, a model of Polaroid camera
 Swing ride, a carousel variation with seats suspended from a rotating top
 A two-door submodel of the Dodge Dart, often a high-performance variation equipped with a 340ci V8 engine

See also
 Home Swinger, a musical instrument created by Yuri Landman
 Swing (disambiguation)
 Swingin' (disambiguation)
 Schwinger (disambiguation)